Ibrahim Erikovych Aldatov (born November 4, 1983 in Beslan, North Ossetian ASSR, Russian SFSR) is a Russian freestyle wrestler of Ossetian heritage who represents Ukraine. He won a gold medal in the 2006 FILA Wrestling World Championships and 2013 FILA Wrestling World Championships and won medals at three other World Championships. He participated at the 2008 Summer Olympics and the 2012 Summer Olympics.

External links 
 
 

Living people
1983 births
Olympic wrestlers of Ukraine
Ukrainian male sport wrestlers
Ukrainian people of Ossetian descent
Wrestlers at the 2008 Summer Olympics
Wrestlers at the 2012 Summer Olympics
People from Beslan
Ossetian people
World Wrestling Championships medalists
World Wrestling Champions
European Wrestling Championships medalists